Belle Adair was an American actress who was active in Hollywood during the silent era. She also performed on stage and in vaudeville.

Biography 
Adair was born in San Jose, California, but moved from there at age 4. She was educated at Immaculate Heart convent in Locust Gap, Pennsylvania, and moved to New York City to study at Brooklyn Teachers Training College. 

Two days after she left Immaculate Heart, she debuted in an amateur performance on a U. S. Naval Reserve boat on which her brother served. Her vaudeville debut came at Poli's Theatre in Hartford, Connecticut. In 1912, she performed as a singing comedienne at the Orpheum Theatre in Harrisburg, Pennsylvania.

While in New York she appeared in several films before marrying Ewald F. Buchal of Passaic, New Jersey. She died in 1926 after a period of poor health.

Selected filmography 

 The Burden Bearer (1915) 
 For the Mastery of the World (1914) 
 Man of the Hour (1914) 
 Mother (1914) 
 Son (1914) 
 Adventures in Diplomacy (1914) 
 Boy (1914) 
 The Character Woman (1914) 
 Moonlight (1914) 
 Duty (1914) 
 The Greatest of These (1914) 
 Wife (1914) 
 The Drug Traffic (1914) 
 At the Court of Prince Make Believe (1914) 
 The Diamond Master (1914) 
 The Good in the Worst of Us (1914) 
 Coming Home (1914) 
 The Case of Cherry Purcelle (1914) 
 Cue and Mis-Cue (1914)

References

External links 

 

1889 births
1926 deaths
American film actresses
American silent film actresses
20th-century American actresses
Actresses from Vermont
People from Wallingford, Vermont
Vaudeville performers